Luis María Carregado (born 19 October 1950 in Buenos Aires, Argentina) is an Argentine former footballer who played for clubs in Argentina, Chile and Mexico.

Teams 
  Boca Juniors 1970–1971
  Estudiantes de La Plata 1972
  Boca Juniors 1973–1974
  Unión Española 1975
  Atlante 1976
  San Martín de Tucumán 1977
  All Boys 1978–1980
  Talleres de Remedios de Escalada 1981–1983

Titles 
  Boca Juniors 1970 (Primera División Argentina Championship)
  Unión Española 1975 (Chilean Primera División Championship)

References 
 

1950 births
Living people
Argentine footballers
Argentine expatriate footballers
Estudiantes de La Plata footballers
San Martín de Tucumán footballers
Boca Juniors footballers
All Boys footballers
Atlante F.C. footballers
Unión Española footballers
Chilean Primera División players
Argentine Primera División players
Liga MX players
Expatriate footballers in Chile
Expatriate footballers in Mexico
Association footballers not categorized by position
Footballers from Buenos Aires